In the Book of Genesis, Zilpah ( Zīlpā, meaning uncertain) was Leah's handmaid, presumed slave, whom Leah gave to Jacob like a wife to bear him children.  Zilpah gave birth to two sons, whom Leah claimed as her own and named Gad and Asher.

Zilpah is given to Leah as a handmaid by Leah's father, Laban, upon Leah's marriage to Jacob (see). According to the early rabbinical commentary Pirke De-Rabbi Eliezer, Zilpah and Bilhah, the handmaids of Leah and Rachel, respectively, were actually younger daughters of Laban.

Zilpah also figures in the competition between Jacob's wives to bear him sons. Leah stops conceiving after the birth of her fourth son, at which point  Rachel, who had not yet borne children, offers her handmaid, Bilhah, to Jacob like a wife in order to have children through her. When Bilhah conceives two sons, Leah takes up the same idea and presents Zilpah to Jacob so she can have children through her. Leah names the two sons of Zilpah and is directly involved in their upbringing.

According to Rashi, an 11th-century commentator, Zilpah was younger than Bilhah, and Laban's decision to give her to Leah was part of the deception he used to trick Jacob into marrying Leah, who was older than Rachel. The morning after the wedding, Laban explained to Jacob, "This is not done in our place, to give the younger before the older". But at night, to mask the deception, Laban gave the veiled bride the younger of the handmaids, so Jacob would think that he was really marrying Rachel, the younger of the sisters.

In Jewish tradition, Zilpah is believed to be buried in the Tomb of the Matriarchs in Tiberias.

In popular culture
In the novel The Red Tent by Anita Diamant, Zilpah and Bilhah are represented as half-sisters of Leah and Rachel by different mothers.

References

Book of Genesis people
Jacob
Jewish concubines
Women in the Hebrew Bible
Slave concubines